Science and Sorcery is an anthology of fantasy and science fiction stories edited by Garret Ford (a pseudonym for William L. Crawford).  It was published by Fantasy Publishing Company, Inc. in 1953 in an edition of 500 copies.  Most of the stories originally appeared in the magazine Fantasy Book.  Others appeared in the magazines Thrilling Wonder Stories, The Vortex and Weird Tales.

Contents
"Scanners Live in Vain", by Cordwainer Smith
"The Little Man on the Subway", by Isaac Asimov & James MacCreigh
"What Goes Up", by Alfred Coppel
"Kleon of the Golden Sun", by Ed Earl Repp
"How High on the Ladder?", by Leo Paige
"Footprints", by Robert E. Gilbert
"The Naming of Names", by Ray Bradbury
"The Eyes", by Henry Hasse
"The Scarlet Lunes", by Stanton A. Coblentz
"Demobilization", by George R. Cowie
"Voices from the Cliff", by John Martin Leahy
"The Lost Chord", by Sam Moskowitz
"The Watchers", by R. H. Deutsch
"The Peaceful Martian", by J. T. Oliver
"Escape to Yesterday", by Arthur J. Burks

Reception
P. Schuyler Miller gave the anthology a negative review, describing the volume as mostly "pretty poor stuff by present-day standards."

References

1953 anthologies
Science fiction anthologies
Fantasy anthologies
Fantasy Publishing Company, Inc. books